Julius Theodoor "Jules" Ancion (August 21, 1924 – November 30, 2011) was a Dutch field hockey player who competed at the 1952 Summer Olympics. He was born in Palembang, Dutch East Indies.

He was a member of the Dutch field hockey team, which won the silver medal. He played all three matches as halfback.

External links
 
Jules Ancion's profile at databaseOlympics
Jules Ancion's profile at Sports Reference.com

1924 births
2011 deaths
Dutch male field hockey players
Olympic field hockey players of the Netherlands
Field hockey players at the 1952 Summer Olympics
Olympic silver medalists for the Netherlands
People from Palembang
Olympic medalists in field hockey
Medalists at the 1952 Summer Olympics
20th-century Dutch people